Los Amores de Kafka (English language:The Loves of Kafta) is a 1988 Argentine romantic biographical film directed by Beda Docampo Feijóo and written by Juan Bautista Stagnaro. Starring Cecilia Roth.

Cast
Susú Pecoraro ....  Milena Jejenska
Jorge Marrale ....  Franz Kafka
Villanueva Cosse ....  Kafka's Father
Salo Pasik ....  Max Brod
Sofía Viruboff ....  Julie
Cecilia Roth ....  Kafka's Sister
Aldo Barbero
Roberto Carnaghi
Andrea Tenuta
Gabriela Flores
Natalio Hoxman
Aldo Pastur
Héctor Pellegrini
Lorenzo Quinteros

Release
The film premiered in Argentina on 4 August 1988.

External links

1988 films
1980s Spanish-language films
Argentine biographical films
Cultural depictions of Franz Kafka
Works about Franz Kafka
Films based on works by Franz Kafka
1980s romance films
Films shot in the Czech Republic
Films set in Prague
1980s Argentine films